North Beach is a town in Calvert County, Maryland, United States. The population was 1,978 at the 2010 U.S. Census.

In addition to a boardwalk, North Beach has multiple parks including Wetlands Overlook Park, Sunrise Garden, Callis Park, and the Walton Beach Nature Preserve. It is also the home of the Boys & Girls Club of Southern Maryland and is slated to be the new home of the Twin Beachs Public Library.

History
The Town of North Beach was originally platted in 1900 and then re-platted in 1908.  It was formally incorporated in 1910.  It was established as strictly a residential town with ads running in local newspapers proclaiming North Beach as “Washington’s most popular salt water resort.”

Early visitors arrived to the Town via steamboat, railroad, oxen carts, trolley car and automobiles.  For more than one hundred years residents and visitors alike have enjoyed the Town's numerous amenities which included:  swimming, crabbing, boating, gambling, fine local restaurants, pier, boardwalk, top named bands, carnivals, parades, hunting, trapping, fun, beauty contests, motor cycles, numerous festivals, search for sharks teeth, fossils, farmer's market and summer breezes.

Revitalization began in the 1980s, and escalated in the 1990s. Tropical Storm Isabel destroyed many of the waterfront homes and boardwalk in 2003.  Since then, the waterfront of North Beach  has been rebuilt with multi-story homes and a condominium.

Transportation

The primary method of transport to and from North Beach is by road. The only significant highway serving the town is Maryland Route 261, which follows Chesapeake Avenue, 7th Street and Bay Avenue through the town from south to north. MD 261 provides the main connection to neighboring Chesapeake Beach and other communities along the Chesapeake Bay. In Chesapeake Beach, MD 261 connects to Maryland State Route 260, which heads inland and connects to Maryland Route 2 and Maryland Route 4.

Geography
North Beach is located at  (38.707423, -76.534450).

Demographics

2010 census
As of the census of 2010, there were 1,978 people, 911 households, and 466 families residing in the town. The racial makeup of the town was 82.9% White, 10.6% African American, 0.3% Native American, 0.8% Asian, 0.1% Pacific Islander, 1.1% from other races, and 4.2% from two or more races. Hispanic or Latino of any race were 3.3% of the population.

There were 911 households, of which 28.0% had children under the age of 18 living with them, 31.8% were married couples living together, 15.5% had a female householder with no husband present, 3.8% had a male householder with no wife present, and 48.8% were non-families. 38.1% of all households were made up of individuals, and 13.5% had someone living alone who was 65 years of age or older. The average household size was 2.17 and the average family size was 2.89.

The median age in the town was 37.8 years. 21.2% of residents were under the age of 18; 9.1% were between the ages of 18 and 24; 30.6% were from 25 to 44; 27.3% were from 45 to 64; and 11.8% were 65 years of age or older. The gender makeup of the town was 46.6% male and 53.4% female.

2000 census
As of the census of 2000, there were 1,880 people, 802 households, and 466 families residing in the town. The racial makeup of the town was 89.52% White, 6.22% African American, 0.96% Native American, 0.96% Asian, 0.37% from other races, and 1.97% from two or more races. Hispanic or Latino of any race were 2.07% of the population.

There were 802 households, out of which 32.8% had children under the age of 18 living with them, 37.9% were married couples living together, 15.1% had a female householder with no husband present, and 41.8% were non-families. 34.4% of all households were made up of individuals, and 8.5% had someone living alone who was 65 years of age or older. The average household size was 2.34 and the average family size was 3.01.

In the town, the population was spread out, with 27.3% under the age of 18, 7.3% from 18 to 24, 37.2% from 25 to 44, 20.9% from 45 to 64, and 7.2% who were 65 years of age or older. The median age was 33 years. For every 100 females, there were 89.1 males. For every 100 females age 18 and over, there were 84.1 males.

The median income for a household in the town was $46,111, and the median income for a family was $51,042. Males had a median income of $42,266 versus $31,563 for females. The per capita income for the town was $22,854. About 10.5% of families and 11.2% of the population were below the poverty line, including 20.4% of those under age 18 and 9.2% of those age 65 or over.

References

External links

 Official website

Towns in Maryland
Towns in Calvert County, Maryland
Maryland populated places on the Chesapeake Bay
Beaches of Maryland